Plausible deniability is the ability of people, typically senior officials in a formal or informal chain of command, to deny knowledge of or responsibility for actions committed by members of their organizational hierarchy. They may do so because of a lack or absence of evidence that can confirm their participation, even if they were personally involved in or at least willfully ignorant of the actions. If illegal or otherwise disreputable and unpopular activities become public, high-ranking officials may deny any awareness of such acts to insulate themselves and shift the blame onto the agents who carried out the acts, as they are confident that their doubters will be unable to prove otherwise. The lack of evidence to the contrary ostensibly makes the denial plausible (credible), but sometimes, it makes any accusations only unactionable.

The term typically implies forethought, such as intentionally setting up the conditions for the plausible avoidance of responsibility for one's future actions or knowledge. In some organizations, legal doctrines such as command responsibility exist to hold major parties responsible for the actions of subordinates who are involved in actions and nullify any legal protection that their denial of involvement would carry.

In politics and espionage, deniability refers to the ability of a powerful player or intelligence agency to pass the buck and to avoid blowback by secretly arranging for an action to be taken on its behalf by a third party that is ostensibly unconnected with the major player. In political campaigns, plausible deniability enables candidates to stay clean and denounce third-party advertisements that use unethical approaches or potentially libelous innuendo.

Although plausible deniability has existed throughout history, the term was coined by the CIA in the early 1960s to describe the withholding of information from senior officials to protect them from repercussions if illegal or unpopular activities became public knowledge.

Overview
Arguably, the key concept of plausible deniability is plausibility. It is relatively easy for a government official to issue a blanket denial of an action, and it is possible to destroy or cover up evidence after the fact, that might be sufficient to avoid a criminal prosecution, for instance. However, the public might well disbelieve the denial, particularly if there is strong circumstantial evidence or if the action is believed to be so unlikely that the only logical explanation is that the denial is false.

The concept is even more important in espionage. Intelligence may come from many sources, including human sources. The exposure of information to which only a few people are privileged may directly implicate some of the people in the disclosure. An example is if an official is traveling secretly, and only one aide knows the specific travel plans. If that official is assassinated during his travels, and the circumstances of the assassination strongly suggest that the assassin had foreknowledge of the official's travel plans, the probable conclusion is that his aide has betrayed the official. There may be no direct evidence linking the aide to the assassin, but collaboration can be inferred from the facts alone, thus making the aide's denial implausible.

History

The term's roots go back to US President Harry Truman's National Security Council Paper 10/2 of June 18, 1948, which defined "covert operations" as "all activities (except as noted herein) which are conducted or sponsored by this Government against hostile foreign states or groups or in support of friendly foreign states or groups but which are so planned and executed that any US Government responsibility for them is not evident to unauthorized persons and that if uncovered the US Government can plausibly disclaim any responsibility for them." During the Eisenhower administration, NSC 10/2 was incorporated into the more-specific NSC 5412/2 "Covert Operations." NSC 5412 was declassified in 1977 and is located at the National Archives. The expression "plausibly deniable" was first used publicly by Central Intelligence Agency (CIA) Director Allen Dulles. The idea, on the other hand, is considerably older. For example, in the 19th century, Charles Babbage described the importance of having "a few simply honest men" on a committee who could be temporarily removed from the deliberations when "a peculiarly delicate question arises" so that one of them could "declare truly, if necessary, that he never was present at any meeting at which even a questionable course had been proposed."

Church Committee
A U.S. Senate committee, the Church Committee, in 1974–1975 conducted an investigation of the intelligence agencies. In the course of the investigation, it was revealed that the CIA, going back to the Kennedy administration, had plotted the assassination of a number of foreign leaders, including Cuba's Fidel Castro, but the president himself, who clearly supported such actions, was not to be directly involved so that he could deny knowledge of it. That was given the term "plausible denial."

Plausible denial involves the creation of power structures and chains of command loose and informal enough to be denied if necessary. The idea was that the CIA and later other bodies could be given controversial instructions by powerful figures, including the president himself, but that the existence and true source of those instructions could be denied if necessary if, for example, an operation went disastrously wrong and it was necessary for the administration to disclaim responsibility.

Later legislative barriers
The Hughes–Ryan Act of 1974 sought to put an end to plausible denial by requiring a presidential finding for each operation to be important to national security, and the Intelligence Oversight Act of 1980 required for Congress to be notified of all covert operations. Both laws, however, are full of enough vague terms and escape hatches to allow the executive branch to thwart their authors' intentions, as was shown by the Iran–Contra affair. Indeed, the members of Congress are in a dilemma since when they are informed, they are in no position to stop the action, unless they leak its existence and thereby foreclose the option of covertness.

Media reports

Iran–Contra affair
In his testimony to the congressional committee studying the Iran–Contra affair, Vice Admiral John Poindexter stated: "I made a deliberate decision not to ask the President, so that I could insulate him from the decision and provide some future deniability for the President if it ever leaked out."

Declassified government documents
 A telegram from the Ambassador in Vietnam Henry Cabot Lodge Jr., to Special Assistant for National Security Affairs McGeorge Bundy on US options with respect to a possible coup, mentions plausible denial.
 CIA and White House documents on covert political intervention in the 1964 Chilean election have been declassified. The CIA's Chief of Western Hemisphere Division, J.C. King, recommended for funds for the campaign to "be provided in a fashion causing (Eduardo Frei Montalva president of Chile) to infer United States origin of funds and yet permitting plausible denial."
 Training files of the CIA's covert "Operation PBSuccess" for the 1954 coup in Guatemala describe plausible deniability. According to the National Security Archive: "Among the documents found in the training files of Operation PBSuccess and declassified by the Agency is a CIA document titled 'A Study of Assassination.' A how-to guide book in the art of political killing, the 19-page manual offers detailed descriptions of the procedures, instruments, and implementation of assassination." The manual states that to provide plausible denial, "no assassination instructions should ever be written or recorded."

Soviet operations 
In the 1980s, the Soviet KGB ran OPERATION INFEKTION (also called "OPERATION DENVER"), which utilised the East German Stasi and Soviet-affiliated press to spread the idea that HIV/AIDS was an engineered bioweapon. The Stasi acquired plausible deniability on the operation by covertly supporting biologist Jakob Segal, whose stories were picked up by international press, including "numerous bourgeois newspapers" such as the Sunday Express. Publications in third-party countries were then cited as the originators of the claims. Meanwhile, Soviet intelligence obtained plausible deniability by utilising the German Stasi in the disinformation operation.

Little green men and Wagner Group
In 2014, "Little green men" — troops without insignia carrying modern Russian military equipment, emerged at the start of the Russo-Ukrainian War, which The Moscow Times described as a tactic of plausible deniability.

The "Wagner Group" a Russian private military company has been described as an attempt at plausible deniability for Kremlin-backed interventions in Ukraine, Syria, and in various interventions in Africa.

Flaws
 It is an open door to the abuse of authority by requiring that the parties in question to be said to be able to have acted independently, which, in the end, is tantamount to giving them license to act independently.
 The denials are sometimes seen as plausible but sometimes seen through by both the media and the populace.
 Plausible deniability increases the risk of misunderstanding between senior officials and their employees.

Other examples
Another example of plausible deniability is someone who actively avoids gaining certain knowledge of facts because it benefits that person not to know.

As an example, a lawyer may suspect that facts exist that would hurt his case but decide not to investigate the issue because if he has actual knowledge, the rules of ethics might require him to reveal the facts to the opposing side.

Council on Foreign Relations

Use in computer networks
In computer networks, plausible deniability often refers to a situation in which people can deny transmitting a file, even when it is proven to come from their computer.

That is sometimes done by setting the computer to relay certain types of broadcasts automatically in such a way that the original transmitter of a file is indistinguishable from those who are merely relaying it. In that way, those who first transmitted the file can claim that their computer had merely relayed it from elsewhere. This principle is used in the opentracker bittorrent implementation by including random IP addresses in peer lists.

In encrypted messaging protocols, such as bitmessage, every user on the network keeps a copy of every message, but is only able to decrypt their own and that can only be done by trying to decrypt every single message. Using this approach it is impossible to determine who sent a message to whom without being able to decrypt it. As everyone receives everything and the outcome of the decryption process is kept private.

It can also be done by a VPN if the host is not known.

In any case, that claim cannot be disproven without a complete decrypted log of all network connections.

Freenet file sharing
The Freenet file sharing network is another application of the idea by obfuscating data sources and flows to protect operators and users of the network by preventing them and, by extension, observers such as censors from knowing where data comes from and where it is stored.

Use in cryptography
In cryptography, deniable encryption may be used to describe steganographic techniques in which the very existence of an encrypted file or message is deniable in the sense that an adversary cannot prove that an encrypted message exists. In that case, the system is said to be "fully undetectable".

Some systems take this further, such as MaruTukku, FreeOTFE and (to a much lesser extent) TrueCrypt and VeraCrypt, which nest encrypted data. The owner of the encrypted data may reveal one or more keys to decrypt certain information from it, and then deny that more keys exist, a statement which cannot be disproven without knowledge of all encryption keys involved. The existence of "hidden" data within the overtly encrypted data is then deniable in the sense that it cannot be proven to exist.

Programming
The Underhanded C Contest is an annual programming contest involving the creation of carefully crafted defects, which have to be both very hard to find and plausibly deniable as mistakes once found.

See also

References

Further reading

External links 

 Sections of the Church Committee about plausible denial on wikisource.org
 Church Committee reports (Assassination Archives and Research Center)
 Church Report: Covert Action in Chile 1963-1973 (U.S. Dept. of State)
 Original 255 pages of Church Committee "Findings and Conclusions" in pdf file

Central Intelligence Agency operations
Political terminology
Military terminology
Euphemisms
Accountability